The Chairman of the Election Commission of Malaysia heads the Election Commission of Malaysia.

List of chairman of the Election Commission 
Since 1957, the Election Commission has been led by 10 Chairman, as shown below:

References

Chairperson
Malaysian civil servants
Government of Malaysia